Friedrich "Fritz" Herkenrath (9 September 1928 in Cologne – 18 April 2016) was a football goalkeeper for West Germany at the 1958 FIFA World Cup. He earned 21 caps between 1954 and 1958.

He took his club team Rot-Weiss Essen to the peak of its history and won a national championship in 1955. The following season, Rot-Weiss Essen became the first German side to qualify for the European Cup.

Initially, Herkenrath played handball. He started out as a right winger and only later became a goalkeeper. Soon after World War II, Herkenrath switched from handball to football. Herkenrath began studying at the German Sport University Cologne where he first encountered Sepp Herberger, who was a tutor there. Playing for 1. FC Köln in the early 1950s, Herkenrath was mostly the second goalkeeper behind the Dutchman Frans de Munck. He joined Rot-Weiß Essen in 1952 and soon rose to prominence playing for Essen. Herkenrath became known as the "flying schoolmaster" due to his main occupation as a teacher.

He retired in 1962 after 336 games in the Oberliga West and became a professor at the college of education in Aachen. He died on April 18, 2016 at the age of 87.

References

External links
 
 
 

1928 births
2016 deaths
Association football goalkeepers
German footballers
Germany international footballers
1958 FIFA World Cup players
1. FC Köln players
Rot-Weiss Essen players
Footballers from Cologne
People from the Rhine Province
FC Viktoria Köln players
West German footballers